The Serbo-Croatian Wikipedia is the Serbo-Croatian version of Wikipedia, the free encyclopedia. There are also national Wikipedia versions for the different standardised varieties of the Serbo-Croatian language, including Bosnian, Croatian, and Serbian. It is written in the Latin script with a converter to Cyrillic.

The Serbo-Croatian Wikipedia currently has  articles, comprising a total of  edits.

Serbo-Croatian Wikipedia has a good readership in the four Serbo-Croatian speaking countries, and the same happens for the other three national standards of the language in the other countries (where other countries is meaning, e.g. Croatian for Montenegro).

History 
The Serbo-Croatian Wikipedia was originally launched on 16 January 2002 at the address sh.wikipedia.com, and moved to its current address sh.wikipedia.org on 23 December 2002. On 12 December 2002, a separate Bosnian Wikipedia was founded, later including articles from the original Serbo-Croatian Wikipedia. On 16 February 2003, separate Croatian and Serbian Wikipedias were launched. , no Montenegrin Wikipedia exists; an experimental Crnogorska Enciklopedija existed from 2006 to 2008, but proposals for a Montenegrin Wikipedia have been rejected four times by Wikipedia's language committee.

The Serbo-Croatian Wikipedia was locked in February 2005 due to inactivity, but was re-opened in May 2005. Some editors were opposed, such as User:Caesarion, who acknowledged that Serbo-Croatian is mutually intelligible with Bosnian, Croatian and Serbian, '[b]ut the wounds of the nineties Balkan wars are all too fresh to... let Serbs, Croats and Bosniaks cooperate on one Wikipedia. We must use separate Wikipedias just to keep the whole project peaceful.' However, the argument to re-open it was successful due to efforts driven by editors such as User:Pokrajac, who stated: 'So, this Wikipedia (if you open it) will be absolutely NPOV, liberal and antinationalist. Many liberal and antinationalist people said that they are talking Serbo-Croatian despite Balkan war(s).'  Richard Rogers (2015) concluded that the separate Wikipedias for Bosnian, Croatian and Serbian were created as 'solutions to the burden of collaboration after the Balkan wars'. He further analysed how each of these Wikipedias as well as the Dutch and English Wikipedias created or translated an entry on the Srebrenica massacre of July 1995, noting how users changed the titles of that article in each Wikipedia and discussed which title was most fitting. Rogers found that in this process, the Serbo-Croatian Wikipedia was considered neutral and unifying, attempting to find the best balance between different standpoints and 'softening both the Bosnian and Serbian points of view'. Like most Wikipedias after much discussion over the years, Serbo-Croatian Wikipedia named the event 'Srebrenica massacre', while only Bosnian and Croatian Wikipedia named it 'Srebrenica genocide', and Dutch Wikipedia 'Fall of Srebrenica'.

In September 2014, the Serbo-Croatian Wikipedia was the second largest South Slavic Wikipedia after the Serbian Wikipedia. In 2017, it was the first South Slavic version and fourth overall Slavic version at 0.44 million articles (7.6% of all articles in Slavophone Wikipedias, behind Russian at 1.4 million, Polish at 1.24 million, and Ukrainian at 0.74 million), ahead of Serbian at 0.37 million (25% smaller).

See also 
 Declaration on the Common Language

References

External links 

 Main page of the Serbo-Croatian Wikipedia

Wikipedias by language
Serbian websites
Croatian websites
Croatian encyclopedias
Serbian-language encyclopedias
2002 establishments